Pavlo Petrovych Kostenko (born October 9, 1976) is a Ukrainian politician and civic activist, Member of Parliament of Ukraine of 8th convocation, member of the Parliamentary faction Samopomich Union.

Kostenko again took part in the July 2019 Ukrainian parliamentary election for Samopomich on its national election list. But in the election the party won 1 seat (in one of the electoral constituencies) while only scoring 0.62% of the national (election list) vote.

Biography 
Kostenko was born in Drohobych, Lviv Oblast, Ukraine. He graduated from the Drohobych State Pedagogical University in 2000, with Specialist degree in Organisation Management, Pedagogics and Methods of Education Basics of Informatics.

He started career in 2000, filling the position of Head of the Marketing Department in TruskavetsInvest. Since 2001 worked in Engineering as Head of Marketing and Trade Department. In 2003-2009 held the position of Deputy Director at UKO Ukraine, in 2009-2012 Director at the Instrumental Centre. Since 2012 Director of Profix Ukraine. In 2013 he co-founded the NGO Initiative of the Free and Responsible VOLA.

Kostenko is married and has two children.

References 

1976 births
Living people
People from Drohobych
Self Reliance (political party) politicians
Eighth convocation members of the Verkhovna Rada
21st-century Ukrainian politicians